Gymnema elegans is a species of plants in the family Apocynaceae. It is found in Tamil Nadu.

References

External links 

 Gymnema elegans at The Plant List
 Gymnema elegans at Tropicos

elegans
Flora of Tamil Nadu
Plants described in 1834